Sophta concavata is a noctuoid moth in the family Erebidae first described by Francis Walker in 1863. It is found in Australia.

References

Boletobiinae